Vootele Hansen (19 January 1962 in Tallinn) was an Estonian politician. He was a member of VIII and IX Riigikogu. 1994-1995 he was Minister of the Environment.

References

1962 births
Living people
Social Democratic Party (Estonia) politicians
Members of the Riigikogu, 1995–1999
Members of the Riigikogu, 1999–2003
Environment ministers of Estonia
University of Tartu alumni
Recipients of the Order of the White Star, 5th Class
Politicians from Tallinn
Members of the Riigikogu, 1992–1995